France  competed at the 2019 World Aquatics Championships in Gwangju, South Korea from 12 to 28 July.

Medalists

Artistic swimming

France's artistic swimming team consisted of 12 athletes (12 female).

Women

 Legend: (R) = Reserve Athlete

Diving

France has entered four divers.

Men

Women

Open water swimming

France qualified five male and four female open water swimmers.

Men

Women

Mixed

Swimming

France has entered 11 swimmers.

Men

Women

Mixed

 Legend: (*) = Swimmers who participated in the heat only.

References

World Aquatics Championships
2019
Nations at the 2019 World Aquatics Championships